Mimodiaxenes elongata is a species of beetle in the family Cerambycidae, and the only species in the genus Mimodiaxenes. It was described by Stephan von Breuning in 1939.

It's 12 mm long and 3 mm wide, and its type locality is Kaipe-Taungu, Sumatra.

References

Apomecynini
Beetles described in 1939
Taxa named by Stephan von Breuning (entomologist)
Monotypic beetle genera